Marlborough Churchill (August 11, 1878 – July 9, 1947) was a U.S. Army officer. Together with Herbert Yardley, he was instrumental in establishing the joint United States Department of State and United States Department of War's cryptanalytic group, called the Black Chamber.

Early life and education
He was born on August 11, 1878 in Andover, Massachusetts, a son of Professor John Wesley Churchill of Andover Theological Seminary and Mary (Cooper) Churchill. Churchill graduated from Phillips Academy in 1896 than attended Harvard University and graduated in 1900.

Military career
He was commissioned in the Field Artillery Branch.

He was promoted to captain on April 13, 1911.

He was promoted to major on May 15, 1917.  On June 12, 1918, he was promoted to colonel in the National Army.  On August 8, 1918, he was promoted to brigadier general.

In 1917, Churchill served on the general staff of the American Expeditionary Force in France. On 5 June 1918, Brigadier General Churchill succeeded Ralph Van Deman as head of the Military Intelligence Branch of the War Department, where he remained until 19 August 1920.
In this capacity, Churchill advocated in December 1918 that MI-8, Cipher Bureau, then headed by Herbert Yardley, continue to do its cryptanalyic work after World War I.

Awards
He received the Army Distinguished Service Medal.

His other decorations included Order of the Bath, officer of the Legion of Honor, commander of the Order of the Crown of Italy, and commander of the Order of Leopold.

Personal life
He married Mary Smith on October 7, 1904.

Death and legacy
He died on July 9, 1947 in Manhattan, New York City. He is buried in Arlington National Cemetery Section 11, GraveSite: SH-385

Churchill is a member of the Military Intelligence Hall of Fame.

References

1878 births
1942 deaths
United States Army generals
Harvard University alumni
Phillips Academy alumni
United States Army generals of World War I